Mohamed Gamal-el-Din (محمد جمال الدين, born 13 April 1972) is an Egyptian male water polo player. He was a member of the Egypt men's national water polo team, playing as a centre back. He was a part of the team at the 2004 Summer Olympics as the team captain. On club level he played for Heliopolis in Egypt.

References

1972 births
Living people
Egyptian male water polo players
Water polo players at the 2004 Summer Olympics
Olympic water polo players of Egypt
Place of birth missing (living people)